Scooby-Doo! Frankencreepy is a 2014 direct-to-DVD animated comedy horror film, and the twenty-third film in the direct-to-video series of Scooby-Doo films. It premiered on July 27, 2014, at San Diego Comic-Con, and was released on Digital HD on August 5, 2014. It was released on DVD and Blu-ray on August 19, 2014.

Plot
Velma gets a call from Cuthbert Crawley, a lawyer for Velma's family who tells her that she has inherited her great uncle's castle in Transylvania, Pennsylvania. At his office, Velma turns the offer down, replying that she wants nothing to do with her uncle, puzzling her friends. Mr. Crawley understands, revealing the curse over the estate. As the gang heads outside, Fred hears a noise from the Mystery Machine, then it explodes and a mysterious character with a mask appears. Crawley reveals that it is the ghost of the Baron, Velma's old ancestor. The remains of the machine explode again, with words saying "stay away from Transylvania", but Fred declares that is where they are going to find the person responsible for destroying the Mystery Machine.

Having no other option, the gang ride in the express. When pressured by the gang, Velma reveals the truth: her real last name is Von Dinkenstein, and the ghost is likely her ancestor, Baron Von Dinkenstein, who was said to have created a monster (which inspired famous novelist Mary Shelley to write her novel Frankenstein). All of a sudden, the train starts to pick up speed. After getting everyone to the last car, Shaggy goes to the front of the train, but finds not the conductor but the Baron's ghost who tears off the control panel before disappearing. The gang still manage to save the last car, the people, and themselves just as the train derails and explodes. As they arrive in town, the people in the car are the Inspector Krunch, the burgermeister and Iago. He takes them to the castle, where they meet Mrs. Vanders, the housekeeper. They arrive in the Baron's laboratory and find the created monster in solid ice. Perturbed by this revelation, Velma vows to recreate the experiment in order to prove that the monster is a fake and tells everyone else to leave. As the rest of the gang leave, Vanders shows Velma a machine which hypnotizes her.

Strange things start happening when the gang goes to a village festival. Daphne is shocked to find that she suddenly become morbidly obese after trying on a dirndl at a clothing store; Shaggy and Scooby win a local eating contest, but upon trying on some handmade lederhosen, they suddenly become courageous and no longer hungry; Fred mourns his beloved Mystery Machine. Iago arrives and saves the gang, who are being threatened by the villagers, and he tells the gang Velma has gone insane.

When they return, Velma now has become drastically different and brought the monster back to life. Shaggy and Scooby, who are still brave, decide to capture the monster themselves. Velma manages to knock out the monster and decides to remove Shaggy and Scooby's brains to put them in it, stating the two of them together have one brain. Things start to get better, as Fred finds a workshop and builds a new mystery machine out of a carriage, Daphne finds that the dirndl has an inflatable suit built into it and the monster rips off Shaggy and Scooby's new outfits, turning them back to their former selves, they had Acupuncture needles. They break free of their restraints and run for their lives, but Velma releases the monster in order to recapture them. When the monster starts to chase them, it accidentally hits the lever of the machine that hypnotized Velma, causing it to revert her back to normal. Iago appears and tells them that they need to leave the castle because it is about to explode. They manage to escape and fake their deaths.

They lure the burgermeister, Krunch, a gypsy, and Vanders to the express train. They trap them in an express car as the train drives. Just as the mystery seems to be solved, the monster reappears, revealed to be a robot with Iago, who then reveals he's actually an undercover DOD agent named Shimidlap. He says that one of their exoskeletons was stolen from their research labs and traced it to Transylvania. It is soon revealed that instead of a culprit, it was actually a conspiracy of revenge. Krunch is revealed to be Crawley, who is actually Cuthbert Crawls, the partner of Cosgood Creeps where they haunted a mansion. The burgermeister is revealed to be C.L. Magnus, who posed as Redbeard's ghost, and then the gypsy is revealed to be Lila, a singer who posed as one of Mamba Wamba's zombies. Finally, Vanders is revealed to be Mama Mione, who posed as Old Iron Face and that the mask used for the Baron disguise was reused from that persona. The quartet reveal that they wanted to get revenge on the gang and once they discover the history of Velma's ancestry, they bought the castle that was sitting on the natural gas which is explosive, but did not know that they could've made a fortune by selling the property. They are soon arrested once again, the Mystery Machine is rebuilt and the gang takes off.

Voice cast
 Frank Welker as Scooby-Doo, Fred Jones
 Matthew Lillard as Shaggy Rogers
 Mindy Cohn as Velma Dinkley
 Grey DeLisle as Daphne Blake, Mama Mione
 Diedrich Bader as Mrs. Vanders
 Dee Bradley Baker as C.L Magnus/Mr. Burger
 Eric Bauza as Daphomatic, AlexSuperFan2112 (credited as "Rock Dude")
 Jeff Glen Bennett as Iago/Agent Shmidlap
 Susanne Blakeslee as Townswoman
 Corey Burton as Baron Basil, Ghost of the Baron
 Candi Milo as Gypsy/Lila
 Kevin Michael Richardson as Cuthbert Crawls/Inspector Krunch
 Fred Tatasciore as Frankencreep

References

External links

 

2014 films
2014 direct-to-video films
2014 animated films
2014 comedy horror films
2010s American animated films
American television films
2010s English-language films
Scooby-Doo direct-to-video animated films
Warner Bros. direct-to-video animated films
Warner Bros. Animation animated films
Frankenstein films
American children's animated comedy films
Films scored by Andy Sturmer
Films set in castles
Films set in Transylvania
2010s children's animated films
American children's animated mystery films